Nicolás Almagro was the defending champion, but he lost to David Ferrer in the semifinals.

Top seed Robin Söderling won his second Swedish Open title by defeating David Ferrer 6–2, 6–2. It also became the last professional match of Söderling's career.

Seeds
The top four seeds received a bye into the second round.

Qualifying

Draw

Finals

Top half

Bottom half

External links
 Main draw
 Qualifying draw

Swedish Open - Singles
2011 Singles